Bebearia pulchella is a butterfly in the family Nymphalidae. It is found in the Central African Republic.

References

Butterflies described in 2006
pulchella
Endemic fauna of the Central African Republic
Butterflies of Africa